Tomajmonostora is a village in Jász-Nagykun-Szolnok county, in the Northern Great Plain region of central Hungary.

Geography

References

External links
 Official site in Hungarian

Tomajmonostora